Sergey Paramonov (born 16 September 1945) is a Soviet fencer. He won a bronze medal in the team épée event at the 1972 Summer Olympics.

References

1945 births
Living people
Russian male fencers
Soviet male fencers
Olympic fencers of the Soviet Union
Fencers at the 1972 Summer Olympics
Olympic bronze medalists for the Soviet Union
Olympic medalists in fencing
Medalists at the 1972 Summer Olympics
Universiade medalists in fencing
Universiade gold medalists for the Soviet Union
Medalists at the 1970 Summer Universiade